Louis Andre Jean "Jean-Louis" Vallas (2 June 1901 – 17 November 1995) was a French poet.

References

External links 
 Site devoted to Jean-Louis Vallas

Writers from Lille
1901 births
1995 deaths
20th-century French poets
Winners of the Prix Broquette-Gonin (literature)